Danú is an Irish traditional music band.

The founding members of Danú (Donnchadh Gough, Dónal Clancy, Daire Bracken, and Benny McCarthy) met in Waterford in Ireland in 1994, and consolidated as a band after performing in the Festival Interceltique de Lorient in 1995.

Their second album, Think Before You Think (2000) was voted Best Overall Traditional Act by Dublin's magazine Irish Music. They are the only band to have been voted Best Traditional Group twice in the BBC Radio 2 Folk Awards, in 2001 and again in 2004 when their version of Tommy Sands's "County Down" also won Best Original Song.

Members

Benny McCarthy is a founding member of Danú; he manages and performs with the band and plays button accordion and melodeon. Benny won the All Ireland Oireachtas in 1994 on both button accordion and melodeon. He is the driving force of Danú and is a key member of several other bands including Raw Bar Collective and Cordeen.

Oisín McAuley, a previous member of Stockton's Wing, plays four- and five-string fiddle with Danú. He has recently released a solo album of fiddle music. Jesse Smith and Daire Bracken previously played fiddle for Danú.

Tom Doorley was the flute-player with Danú from 1996 until he retired from large-scale touring in 2007, and often acts as the spokesman for the band on stage. He teaches and lives in Dublin and makes an appearance now and again with Danú at concerts in Ireland and Europe. Ivan Goff, who had been a guest on several tours before Tom Doorley's retirement, became the full-time flute player for the band following his retirement. An accomplished Uileann piper, flute and whistle player from Dublin, Goff is based in Brooklyn, New York.

Éamon Doorley plays bouzouki and fiddle, and is the younger brother of Tom Doorley. His bouzouki playing has a strong emphasis on countermelody. He currently collaborates with his wife Julie Fowlis, playing mainly Scottish Gaelic music and song. The Doorley brothers joined Danú in 1996.

Donnchadh Gough, another founding member of the band, plays both bodhran and uillean pipes. He guests on Bodhran with Danú in Ireland and Europe. Amy Richter has performed on Bodhran with Danú during US tours since Dec 2017.

Until 2016, the band's lead singer was Muireann Nic Amhlaoibh, who replaced earlier singer Ciarán Ó Gealbháin, a tenor who left to finish his education in May 2003, and who had in turn replaced founding member Cárthach Mac Craith in August 1999. Nic Amhlaoibh sang in English and Irish, in the folk and sean-nós traditions, and also played flute and whistle. In January, 2016, it was announced that she would be leaving the band to be replaced by Sean Nós singer Nell Ní Chróinín.

Dónal Clancy a founding member of Danú was the guitar player for the band in 1995 and returned to the band in 2002 until he retired from Danú in March 2017. During his absence, he was replaced by guitar player from Newport, Co.Tipperary Noel Ryan. Clancy was replaced by Tony Byrne, who had done tours with the band since 2005.

Discography
 Danú (1997)
 Think Before You Think (2000)
 All Things Considered (2002)
 The Road Less Travelled (2003)
 Up In The Air (2004)
 When All Is Said and Done (2005)
 One Night Stand (DVD) (2005)
 Seanchas (2010)
 Buan (2015)
 Ten Thousand Miles (2018)

Side projects
 Dual (2008) - Éamon and Muireann with Julie Fowlis and Ross Martin
Raw Bar Collective(2011)-Benny McCarthy
Cordeen (2017)-Benny McCarthy

References

External links
 Danú's website
Benny McCarthy website
 Dónal Clancy's website
 Muireann Nic Amhlaoibh's website
 Liam Clancy's website
 Danú:The Myth, The Goddess, The Band
 Promotional Pressures: Danú, young magic trad band on their recent activities

Celtic music groups
Irish folk musical groups
Musical groups from County Waterford
Celtic mythology in music